Locus control region, beta is a protein that in humans is encoded by the LCRB gene.

References